Percival Serle (18 July 1871 – 16 December 1951) was an Australian biographer and bibliographer.

Early life
Serle was born in Elsternwick, Victoria to English parents who had migrated as children and for many years worked in a life assurance office before in November 1910 becoming chief clerk and accountant at the University of Melbourne. He married artist Dora Beatrice Hake on 29 March 1910. They were to have three children. One son, Alan Geoffrey Serle, was selected as 1947 Victorian Rhodes scholar.

Serle ran a second-hand bookshop during the depression; was guide-lecturer at the National Gallery of Victoria; curator of the Art Museum of the Gallery; and member of the council of the Victorian Artists Society. He was also president of the Australian Literature Society.

Publications
Serle's publications included an edition, with notes, of A Song to David and Other Poems by the 18th-century English poet, Christopher Smart; A Bibliography of Australasian Poetry and Verse: Australia and New Zealand; An Australasian Anthology (with 'Furnley Maurice' and R. H. Croll); A selection of Poems by Furnley Maurice; Dictionary of Australian Biography; and A Primer of Collecting.

The Dictionary took more than twenty years to complete and contains more than one thousand biographies of prominent Australians or persons closely connected with Australia. Serle comments in the Preface that "I have endeavoured to make the book worthy of its subject. It would have been better could I have spent another five years on it, but at seventy-five years of age one realizes there is a time to make an end." He was awarded the Australian Literature Society Gold Medal for 1949 for this work.

Serle died in Hawthorn, Victoria, aged 80 on 16 December 1951.

Notes

References
The Oxford Companion to Australian Literature (Second Edition, 1994).
Geoffrey Serle, 'Serle, Percival (1871–1951)', Australian Dictionary of Biography, Volume 11, MUP, 1988, pp 567–569.

External links
Dictionary of Australian Biography (1949) courtesy of Project Gutenberg Australia (written by Serle, contains details of people who died before 1942).

1871 births
1951 deaths
People educated at Scotch College, Melbourne
Australian biographers
Australian bibliographers
Male biographers
Australian booksellers
Australian people of English descent
Writers from Melbourne
ALS Gold Medal winners
University of Melbourne people
People from Elsternwick, Victoria